Gossea is a genus of hydrozoans belonging to the family Olindiidae.

The species of this genus are found in Europe and America.

Species:

Gossea brachymera 
Gossea corynetes 
Gossea faureae 
Gossea indica

References

Olindiidae
Hydrozoan genera